Intelligent Money is an investment management firm, personal pension provider and ISA Plan Manager, based in Nottingham, authorised and regulated by the Financial Conduct Authority. The company provides risk managed investment portfolios  to its own Private Clients and also works with financial advisers, solicitors, accountants and charities.

History
The company was established in 2002 by founder and sole financier Julian Penniston-Hill.

In 2012, Intelligent Money took over the running of leading French bank BNP Paribas's book of SIPP business.

In March 2019, Intelligent Money stopped accepting Defined Benefit pension transfers into its SIPPs, though some other providers had already ceased accepting such transfers.

Operations
Intelligent Money offers 5 risk/reward rated investment portfolios.

In addition, it offers 2 target dated investment strategies, one for future capital withdrawal and the other for future income withdrawals.

All of these portfolios invest in passive funds that are actively managed with free pension and ISA administration and access to a named Private Client Manager. Intelligent Money has a minimum investment criteria of £100,000 per client.

Corporate associations
Intelligent Money works in strategic partnership with Quilter Cheviot in the running of the IM Optimum Portfolios and is known to bank with Coutts & Co.

References

External links
 Official Website
 Intelligent Money on Financial Conduct Authority

Companies based in Nottingham
Investment companies of the United Kingdom